Harris County Courthouse may refer to:

Harris County Courthouse (Georgia), Hamilton, Georgia
Harris County Civil Courthouse, Houston, Texas
Harris County Criminal Justice Center, Houston, Texas
1910 Harris County Courthouse, Houston, Texas